The MacRory Cup is an inter-college (school) Gaelic football tournament in Ulster at senior "A" grade. The MacLarnon Cup is the competition for schools at senior 'B' grade.

Players must be under nineteen at the start of the tournament. The winners advance to the semi-finals of the Hogan Cup, the All-Ireland colleges "A" senior football championship.

The competition and trophy are named after Joseph MacRory, then Bishop of Down and Connor, who donated the first cup in 1923.

The current champions are Omagh CBS, after beating Holy Trinity College, Cookstown in an all-Tyrone final.

The final is held every year on (or close to) Saint Patrick's Day and is televised live on BBC Northern Ireland along with the Ulster Rugby Schools Cup final. The venue for the last number of years has been the Athletic Grounds in Armagh. Previous finals have been held in Coalisland and Casement Park.

History
An inter-seminary football competition between St Macartan's College, Monaghan and St Patrick's Grammar School, Armagh had been started in 1902. This was a soccer competition until, in the aftermath of the 1916 Rising, a vote was taken to change over to Gaelic rules and St Patrick's won the first Gaelic encounter in 1918 by 4–4 to 0–1.

Bishop Joseph MacRory, the Bishop of Down and Connor at this time, "offered" to present a Cup for the winners of an Ulster Secondary schools' competition. The "offer" was not honoured for another five seasons however, and, in the interim, the matches between other seminaries and St Patrick's Armagh are recorded as "challenges" until the arrival of the first MacRory Cup in late spring 1923.

Over the next five seasons the competition was played on a league basis until in 1928 an Ulster Colleges' Committee was established and the MacRory Cup competition became the new body's main competition.  Participation in the MacRory Cup in its early years was confined to those who attended boarding schools. St Patrick's Armagh were the first winners in 1923, and dominated the competition in its early years. First time victories by other challengers were recorded by St Macartan's (1930), St Patrick's College, Cavan (1935), and St Colman's College, Newry (1949).

The 1930s was notable for the affiliation of a number of Christian Brothers' schools. These were "day schools" (i.e. non boarding schools) which catered mainly for boys from humble backgrounds, but they did not yet have the prowess to compete with the established diocesan colleges, as was confirmed by comprehensive defeats for Monaghan CBS (1935), and Abbey CBS, Newry (1944 and 1947).

1954 was a watershed year in that the triumph of Abbey CBS after a replay over St Patrick's Cavan was the first MacRory Cup win by a "day school"; the Abbey CBS repeated this feat in 1959 and 1964, but no other day school made the breakthrough until St Mary's CBS in 1971; next came Omagh CBS in 1974.

1976 marks another significant landmark in the history of the competition although that particular final ended in defeat for St Patrick's College, Maghera a. It ushered in an extraordinary sequence of 14 final appearances by St Patrick's College, Maghera in the following 15 years, 8 of which were won, including 4 consecutive victories 1982–85. Those 15 years witnessed a legendary rivalry between St Patrick's College, Maghera and St Colman's College, Newry when they faced one another in 10 Finals, including replays. These included the iconic 1989 final, won by St Patrick's College, Maghera on the scoreline 4–10 to 4–9. Those were the days when the blanket defence would have been regarded as a distasteful, unchivalrous, and unthinkable option.

The 1990s marked the arrival of St Patrick's Academy, Dungannon and St Michael's College, Enniskillen at centre stage, and accelerated change in the educational domain with the disappearance of the remaining boarding departments in schools, and an equalisation in standards across a greater range of schools.

The new millennium produced a victory in 2000 for the original kingpins, St Patrick's Armagh, their first victory since 1953, and the next decade was marked by the emergence and appearance of Omagh CBS in 7 Finals.

The MacRory Cup, first donated by Bishop MacRory in 1923, is now contested by 10 schools annually. The original trophy was replaced in 1962, and that trophy, in turn, was retired and donated to the O’Fiaich Library in February 2012. A replacement trophy was donated to Ulster Colleges by Cardinal Brady, thereby perpetuating the historic link between the Archdiocese of Armagh and this competition. The trophy won in March 2012 by St Michael's, Enniskillen is therefore the third cup to bear Cardinal MacRory's name.

The 2020 final, along with all other Gaelic game activity, between St Colman's, Newry and St Patrick's, Maghera was postponed due to the impact of the COVID-19 pandemic on Gaelic games. Ulster Colleges announced in June 2020 that they hoped to find a date in October to play the MacRory and McLarnon Cup finals. Ulster Colleges had provisionally scheduled the MacRory final for 9 October 2020. However the decision to cancel the final was made after an emergency Ulster Schools GAA meeting. As a result, the 2019/20 Danske Bank MacRory Cup was shared between St Patrick's Maghera and St Colman's Newry.

Fifteen schools have their names on the MacRory Cup with St Colman's College, Newry winning the first of their record 19 titles in 1949 and St Patrick's College, Maghera, who are in second place with 15 crowns, won their first in 1977.

St Colman's College, Newry and St Patrick's College, Maghera also lead the way in terms of Hogan Cup titles won by Ulster schools with eight and five respectively.

Competition format
Current format
The format introduced at the start of the 2017–18 season continues. Sixteen teams compete in four groups of four teams. After the group rounds, all matches are knock-out. The four group winners are given byes to the quarter-finals. The four teams who finished third play the four teams who finished fourth in playoff round 1 with the winners playing the four group runners-up in playoff round 2 for the four remaining quarter-final places.

2016-17 format
The format was changed for the 2016–17 season. Fourteen teams competed in three groups - Groups A and B had five teams and Group C had four teams. The three group winners and the best group runner-up advanced to the quarter-finals. The fifth-placed teams in groups A and B were eliminated. The remaining eight teams played-off in four matches with the four winners completing the quarter-final line-up. From the quarter-finals onwards all matches were knock-out.

Previous format
The competition began with a round-robin tournament consisting of two groups of six teams. The top two teams from each group advanced to the knockout stages. Four playoff matches were held between the bottom four teams of Group A and Group B to complete the quarter final lineup.

List of titles by college

List of finals by year
 Until 1935 the MacRory Cup was played on a league basis with the league winners claiming the title. 
 The number in brackets is the number of the title win e.g. (15) is that school's 15th title.
 The 2001 and 2020 titles were shared as neither competition could be completed.
 Teams in bold went on to win the Hogan Cup in the same year.
 The Iggy Jones Man of the Match trophy was first awarded in 1993.

 The Iggy Jones Man of the Match trophy has only been awarded to players on the losing side on three occasions. Martin Clarke and Joe Ireland for St Louis, Kilkeel in consecutive finals, and Colm Greenan for St Macartan's Monaghan.
 St Patrick's College, Maghera made their final debut in 1976, and then went on to feature in every final until 1986. They won 6 and lost 5 of those finals.
 St Colman's College, Newry and St Patrick's College, Maghera dominated the competition between 1975 and 1991, with at least one of the schools featuring in the final.  The schools won 14 titles in 17 years, including every title between 1975 and 1985.
 St Patrick's College, Maghera didn't win a final against their illustrious rivals until 1989. St Colman's College, Newry won the first 5 finals ('76, '78,'79, '81, and '88) between the two sides.
 Between 1988 and 1990 St. Patrick's College, Maghera and St Colman's College, Newry played 6 MacRory finals.  The 1988 final went to a second replay and the 1990 final went to a replay
 The MacRory Cup had first time winners in 2017 St. Mary's Grammar School, Magherafelt and 2018 St Ronan's Lurgan. Prior to that the competition did not have a first time winner since St. Patrick's Academy, Dungannon's victory in 1991
St Patrick's Grammar School, Armagh(1950–52), St Michael's College, Enniskillen (1968-70) and St Colman's College, Newry (1989–91) are the only schools to have lost 3 consecutive finals.

Longest winning streaks
St Patrick's Grammar School, Armagh won 7 consecutive MacRory Cups (One Shared), when the winners were decided on a league basis.

Most common finals

Longest gap between title victories

Noted footballers / College All Stars
In 2000 a Millennium team was selected by the participating schools as a best team 1988–2000.
1. Jonathon Kelly 
2. Paddy McGuinness 
3. Seán Marty Lockhart - Won consecutive MacRory Cups with St Patrick's College, Maghera
4. Fergal P. McCusker 
5. Tony McEntee 
6. Kieran McGeeney 
7. Karl Diamond - Won consecutive MacRory & Hogan Cups with St Patrick's College, Maghera
8. Paul Brewster 
9. Paul McGrane 
10. Éamonn Burns - Won consecutive MacRory & Hogan Cups with St Patrick's College, Maghera 
11. John Duffy 
12. Paddy McKeever 
13. Raymond Gallagher 
14. James McCartan Jr. - Won MacRory and Hogan Cups with St Colman's College, Newry  
15. Oisín McConville played for St Patrick's Grammar School, Armagh.
Other notable players include:

 Dermot McNicholl played in five MacRory Cup finals in the early 1980s with St. Patrick's College, Maghera. Winning four titles and was twice the victorious captain.
 Martin Clarke produced a number of memorable displays in 2005 and captained his school St Louis, Kilkeel in 2006.
 Michael Murphy played for St Eunan's College, reaching the 2008 semi-final.

See also
 Schools' Senior A Football
 Hogan Cup (All-Ireland Championship)
 Aonghus Murphy Memorial Cup (Connacht Championship)
 Brother Bosco Cup (Leinster Championship)
 Corn Uí Mhuirí (Munster Championship)

 Schools' Senior A Hurling
 Dr Croke Cup (All-Ireland Championship)
 Leinster Championship
 Dr Harty Cup (Munster Championship)

 Schools' Senior B Hurling
  Mageean Cup (Ulster Championship)

References

External links
 

Gaelic football competitions in Ulster
Gaelic football cup competitions